Aleksei Vladimirovich Yedunov (born 11 March 1986) is a former Russian professional football player.

Club career
He made his Russian Football National League debut for FC Anzhi Makhachkala on 26 March 2006 in a game against FC KAMAZ Naberezhnye Chelny. Overall, he played 5 seasons in the FNL for Anzhi, FC Chernomorets Novorossiysk, FC Nosta Novotroitsk and FC Sibir Novosibirsk.

External links
 
 

1986 births
Footballers from Moscow
Living people
Russian footballers
FC Anzhi Makhachkala players
FC Spartak Trnava players
FC Chernomorets Novorossiysk players
FC Dynamo Stavropol players
Czech First League players
FC Hradec Králové players
FC Sibir Novosibirsk players
Association football midfielders
FC Shinnik Yaroslavl players
FC Lokomotiv Moscow players
Russian expatriate footballers
Expatriate footballers in the Czech Republic
Expatriate footballers in Slovakia
FC Nosta Novotroitsk players